Acacia aprepta is a species of Acacia native to eastern Australia.

It is known to have dark grey or black coloured bark that is longitudinally furrowed. The light brown to greyish, glabrous and resinous branchlets are angular to terete. Like most species of Acacia it has phyllodes rather than true leaves. The linear or very narrowly oblanceolate and flat phyllodes can be straight or slightly sub falcate. After flowering, light brown chartaceous seed pods form that have a linear or very narrowly oblong shape and are raised over the seeds.

It has a limited distribution in an area of south-eastern Queensland in the western parts of the Darling Downs and around Maranoa where it grows in shallow gravelly or loamy sandy soils often over sandstone as a part of scrubland communities where it can form dense thickets.

See also
List of Acacia species

References

aprepta
Fabales of Australia
Flora of Queensland
Taxa named by Leslie Pedley
Plants described in 1974